This is a list of the Croatian number-one singles of 2023 as compiled by Croatia Songs, part of Hits of the World Billboard chart series, provided by Billboard.

Number-one artists

References

Croatia Songs
2023
Number-one singles